National Taipei University of Technology (NTUT, Taipei Tech) is a public university in Taipei, Taiwan. It is a member of the Global Research & Industry Alliance (Gloria) of the Ministry of Science and Technology and accredited by AACSB. Located in the Daan district of Taipei, the school was established in 1912 as the School of Industrial Instruction, one of the earliest intermediate-higher educational institute in Taiwan. 

The current president of the university is Sea-Fue Wang. The university is part of the University System of Taipei, along with National Taipei University and Taipei Medical University. Its comprehensive undergraduate and graduate programs offer degrees in the STEM fields as well as design, architecture, management, humanities, and social sciences. 

The 495-acre campus in downtown Taipei was divided into three sections during the city's development. The main campus (West, East, and South) in Taipei now only spans 22 acres, next to the affluent Huashan 1914 Creative Park and the Guang Hua neighborhood, an area known as the Electric Town of Taipei due to the computer goods and electronics stores.

History
The university was established as the School of Industrial Instruction (工業講習所) in 1912. The institution underwent several name changes and reorganizations during the Japanese  colonial period in Taiwan. After the (Nationalist) Republic of China  central government settled in Taiwan as an outcome of the war against the Communist regime, the institution was renamed Provincial Taipei Institute of Technology (臺灣省立臺北工業專科學校) in 1948 and served as a  vocational technical college. In 1981, it was renamed National Taipei Institute of Technology (國立臺北工業專科學校). In the 1990s its status was upgraded to that of a university, resulting in its name change to National Taipei University of Technology (國立臺北科技大學) in 1997.

Academics

NTUT includes six colleges, two centers, and one office. The university currently has 451 full-time faculty members.

College of Electric Engineering and Computer Science
Dept. of Computer Science and Information Engineering - Bachelor/ MS/ Ph.D Program
Dept. of Electrical Engineering - Bachelor/ MS/ Ph.D Program
Dept. of Electronic Engineering - Bachelor Program
Dept. of Electro-Optical Engineering - Bachelor/ MS/ Ph.D Program
Institute of Computer and Communication Engineering - MS/ Ph.D Program

College of Mechanical and Electrical Engineering
Dept. of Mechanical Engineering - Bachelor Program
Dept. of Vehicle Engineering - Bachelor/MS Program
Dept. of Energy and Refrigerating Air-Conditioning Engineering - Bachelor/MS Program
Institute of Mechatronic Engineering - MS Program
Institute of Manufacturing Technology - MS Program/Ph.D. Program
Institute of Automation Technology - MS Program
Institute of Mechanical And Electrical Engineering - Ph.D. Program

College of Engineering
Dept. of Chemical Engineering and Biotechnology - Bachelor Program
Dept. of Civil Engineering - Bachelor Program
 Dept. of Materials and Mineral Resources Engineering - Bachelor Program
Dept. of Molecular Science and Engineering - Bachelor Program
Institute of Biotechnology - MS Program
Institute of Chemical Engineering - MS/Ph.D Program
Institute of Civil and Disaster Prevention Engineering - MS Program
Institute of Environmental Engineering and Management - MS Program
 Institute of Materials Science and Engineering - MS/ Ph.D Program
Institute of Mineral Resources Engineering - MS/ Ph.D Program
Institute of Organic and Polymeric Materials - MS Program

College of Management
Dept. of Business Management - Bachelor/ MBA Program
Dept. of Industrial Engineering and Management - Bachelor/ MBA/ Ph.D Program
Institute of Information and Logistics Management - MBA Program
Institute of Services Technology and Management - MBA Program
Institute of Industrial and Business Management - Ph.D Program
EMBA - MBA Program
International MBA - MBA Program
International Master of Financial Technology & Innovative Entrepreneur (IMFI) - MBA Program

College of Design
Dept. of Architecture - Bachelor Program
Dept. of Industrial Design - Bachelor Program
Institute of Innovation and Design - MFA Program
Institute of Design - Ph.D Program
Institute of Architecture and Urban Design - MFA Program
Institute of Interactive Media Design - MFA Program
International Program in Creative & Sustainable Architecture Studies - Master Program

College of Humanities and Social Sciences
Dept. of Cultural Vocation Development - Bachelor Program
Dept. of English  - Bachelor/ MA Program in Applied Linguistics
Institute of Technological and Vocational Education - MEd/ EdD Program
Institute of Intellectual Property - MS Program

Teacher Education Center

General Education Center

Physical Education Office

Architecture & Landscape

The Green Gate
The Green Gate was completed in 2010 to make the campus more eco-friendly. It won the Special Mention of Green Campus and Most Favorable Online in the 2010 Taipei Landscape Award.

Ranks

NTUT is ranked 436 globally in 2023 and 73 in Asia in 2023 by QS . 

NTUT is ranked 1001-1200 globally in 2023 and 251-300 in Asia in 2022 by Times Higher Educuation.  

NTUT is ranked 301-500 in the world by QS Graduate Employability Rankings 2022.

Notable alumni
 Harlem Yu, Award-winning singer-songwriter and television host
 Lee Shih-chuan, Secretary-General of Executive Yuan (2014-2015), deputy mayor of Kaohsiung City
 Li Kuei-Hsien, Taiwanese author and poet, noted for writing extended verses with Taiwanese Hokkien, was a nominee for the Nobel Prize in Literature by the International Poets Academy of India
 Michio Mado, Japanese poet, received the international Hans Christian Andersen Medal in 1994 for his "lasting contribution to children's literature"
 Peter Chou, Co-founder of HTC
 Shen Jong-chin, Minister of Economic Affairs
 Chang Ching-chung, member of the Legislative Yuan (2005-2016)
 Suhon Lin, businessman and billionaire
 T.H. Tung, Taiwanese businessman and philanthropist, co-founder of Asus and its former vice chairman, and chairman of Pegatron  
 Morin Kaku, Renowned Taiwanese-Japanese architect, lead designer of the Kasumigaseki Building, the first modern office skyscraper in Japan. He later founded the Kaku Morin Group architecture firm, had numerous projects both in Japan and Taiwan
 An-Pang Tsai (1958-2019), Academician of Academia Sinica (2018), 2015 distinguished professor of Tohoku University, receiver of 2014 Medal with Purple Ribbon awarded by the Government of Japan 
 Robert C.Y Wu, founder of Eslite Bookstore, one of the largest bookstore chains in Taiwan and around Asia
 Peter Tsai, inventor of the N95 mask

Transportation
The university is accessible from the Zhongxiao Xinsheng Station of Taipei Metro, a major transfer station for Bannan Line and the Zhonghe–Xinlu Line. The station is also sub-named National Taipei University of Technology (臺北科大) in smaller text on station signage.

See also
 List of universities in Taiwan

References

External links

Official website 

 
1912 establishments in Taiwan
Educational institutions established in 1912
Universities and colleges in Taipei
Scientific organizations based in Taiwan
Universities and colleges in Taiwan
Technical universities and colleges in Taiwan